David A. Lowy is an American attorney, academic and jurist serving as an associate justice of the Supreme Judicial Court of Massachusetts.

Early life and education
Lowy is a native of Peabody, Massachusetts and graduated from Peabody Veterans Memorial High School in 1978. Lowy received his Bachelor of Arts from the University of Massachusetts Amherst in 1983 and his Juris Doctor from Boston University School of Law in 1987.

Career 
After law school, Lowy became an associate in the litigation department of Goodwin, Procter & Hoar from 1987 to 1988 and again 1989 to 1990. In 1988, he served as a law clerk to Judge Edward F. Harrington of the United States District Court for the District of Massachusetts. He was also an assistant district attorney in Essex and Suffolk counties and served as deputy legal counsel to Governor Bill Weld.

Judicial career
Lowy was previously an associate justice of the Massachusetts Superior Court. He was nominated to the court by Governor Paul Cellucci in 2001.

He was nominated to the court by Governor Charlie Baker on June 14, 2016, and confirmed by the Governor's Council on July 27, 2016. He succeeded Justice Robert J. Cordy upon his retirement on August 12, 2016.

In July 2018, Lowy wrote for the unanimous court when it found that a probationer suffering from opioid use disorder could be imprisoned for a probation violation after she tested positive for fentanyl.

Teaching
Lowy has had several teaching positions which include adjunct professorships at New England Law Boston since 1991, Suffolk University Law School from 1995 to 2005, and Boston University School of Law since 2006, where he teaches courses in evidence.

References

External links
Official Biography on Supreme Court website

Living people
Date of birth missing (living people)
Place of birth missing (living people)
University of Massachusetts Amherst alumni
Boston University School of Law alumni
Boston University School of Law faculty
Massachusetts lawyers
Massachusetts Superior Court justices
Justices of the Massachusetts Supreme Judicial Court
New England Law Boston faculty
Suffolk University Law School faculty
21st-century American judges
Year of birth missing (living people)